Club Brugge KV is a football club based in Bruges in Belgium. It was founded in 1891 and is one of the top clubs in Belgium.

List of presidents
Below is the official presidential history of Club Brugge KV
  Philippe Delescluze (1891-00)
  Albert Seligmann (1900–02)
  Alfons De Meulemeester (1903–14)
  Albert Dyserynck (1919–31)
  Fernand Hanssens (1932–37)
  Emile De Clerck (1937–59)
  André De Clerck (1959–73)
  Fernand De Clerck (1973–99)
  Michel Van Maele (1999-03)
  Dr. Michel D'Hooghe (2003–09)
  Pol Jonckheere (2009–11)
  Bart Verhaeghe (2011– )

Honorary presidents and directors
  Dr. Michel D'Hooghe (Honorary president)
  Fernand De Clerck (Honorary president)
  Marcel Kyndt (Honorary vice-president)
  Raoul Beuls (Honorary vice-president)
  Chris Caestecker (Honorary director)
  Guido Claeys (Honorary director)
  Dr. William De Groote (Honorary director)
  Guy Jacobs (Honorary director)
  Pol Jonckheere (Honorary director)
  André Piccu (Honorary director)
  Herman Valcke (Honorary director)
  Hugo Vandamme (Honorary director)
  Dr. Roland Watteyne (Honorary director)

References

External links
Official website

Presidents